Patrick Dogue (born 9 March 1992) is a German modern pentathlete who won the national title in 2013 and 2015. He qualified for the 2016 Summer Olympics by placing second at the 2016 World Cup; he finished sixth in the Olympics. His brother Marvin is also an international modern pentathlete.

References

1992 births
Living people
Modern pentathletes at the 2016 Summer Olympics
Olympic modern pentathletes of Germany
German male modern pentathletes
World Modern Pentathlon Championships medalists
Modern pentathletes at the 2020 Summer Olympics
Sportspeople from Ludwigshafen
20th-century German people
21st-century German people